Thomas P. Wiseau ( or ) is an American actor and filmmaker. He is known for writing, producing, directing, and starring in the 2003 film The Room, which has been described by many critics as one of the worst films ever made and has gained cult status. He also co-directed the 2004 documentary Homeless in America and created the 2015 sitcom The Neighbors.

Many details about Wiseau's personal life (including his age, source of wealth, and background) remain unverified, and as such have been the subject of intense fan speculation and various conflicting reports. The 2013 non-fiction book The Disaster Artist: My Life Inside The Room, the Greatest Bad Movie Ever Made by Greg Sestero, as well as its 2017 film adaptation, chronicle the making of The Room and Wiseau's life behind the scenes.

Early life

Wiseau is very secretive about his early life. In various interviews, he has claimed to have lived in France "a long time ago"; claimed he grew up in New Orleans, Louisiana; and described having "an entire family" in Chalmette, Louisiana. In a 2010 interview with Crikey, Wiseau gave an age which would indicate he was born in 1968 or 1969, but friend Greg Sestero claims in his 2013 memoir The Disaster Artist that his brother's girlfriend obtained copies of Wiseau's U.S. immigration papers and found that Wiseau was born "much earlier" than he claimed, in an Eastern Bloc country in the mid- to late-1950s.

In his 2016 documentary Room Full of Spoons, longtime associate of Wiseau, Rick Harper, claims to have researched Wiseau's background and concluded that he is Polish and originally from the city of Poznań, and that he was born in 1955. Wiseau confirmed publicly for the first time, in November 2017, that he is originally from Europe: "Long story short, I grew up in Europe a long time ago, but I'm American and very proud of it."

In The Disaster Artist, Sestero asserts that Wiseau revealed to him—through "fantastical, sad, self-contradictory stories"—that as a young adult he moved to Strasbourg, where he adopted the name "Pierre" and worked as a restaurant dishwasher. According to Sestero, Wiseau described being wrongfully arrested following a drug raid at a hostel and being traumatised by his mistreatment by the French police, which led him to immigrate to the U.S. to purportedly live with an aunt and uncle in Chalmette. These claims have not been verified.

Sestero (the only source Wiseau is alleged to have told this to) asserts that after Wiseau had lived in Louisiana for some amount of time, he subsequently moved to San Francisco, California, where he worked as a street vendor selling toys to tourists near Fisherman's Wharf. Wiseau supposedly gained the nickname "The Birdman" for his bird toys, which were only popular in Europe at the time; this led him to legally change his name when he became a U.S. citizen to Thomas Pierre Wiseau, taking the French word for "bird" (oiseau) and replacing the O with the W of his birth name.

Around this time, Wiseau also claims to have obtained a degree in psychology from Laney Community College in Oakland, asserting that he had graduated on the honor roll.

According to Sestero, Wiseau claims to have worked a variety of jobs in the San Francisco Bay Area, including restaurant busboy and hospital worker, and ran a business called Street Fashions USA that sold irregular blue jeans at discounted prices. He then claims to have eventually purchased and rented out large retail spaces in and around San Francisco and Los Angeles, making him independently wealthy. Sestero states that the idea of Wiseau becoming wealthy so quickly via the jobs he claims to have had is so unlikely that he himself finds it impossible to believe. Sestero suggests on several occasions that many people involved with the creation of The Room believed the film to be part of some money laundering scheme for organized crime, but Sestero himself considers this unlikely.

Wiseau claims to have been involved in a near-fatal car crash in California after another driver ran a red light and struck Wiseau's vehicle; as a result, Wiseau was hospitalized for several weeks. Sestero suggests that this incident was the turning point in Wiseau's life that led him to pursue his dreams of becoming an actor and director, ambitions that he had long neglected while pursuing financial security.

Career

Film

Influences and early work
Wiseau has stated that he has been influenced by the films The Guns of Navarone and Citizen Kane, and specifically the actors James Dean and Marlon Brando. According to Sestero, Wiseau's obsession with James Dean was so intense that he often visited a Los Angeles restaurant owned by a former acquaintance of Dean, and that several lines of dialogue in The Room (including the infamous cry "You are tearing me apart, Lisa!") were based on lines from Rebel Without a Cause. Wiseau also cites his cinematic influences as including Tennessee Williams, Orson Welles, Elizabeth Taylor, and Alfred Hitchcock.

Sestero notes that the actor had been "trying to bust in" to Hollywood since the late 1980s, and recounts being shown an undated VHS tape of Wiseau in Vincent Chase's acting class (with whom Wiseau had a contentious relationship). He was apparently enrolled in Chase's program around 1994. Wiseau also allegedly attended film classes at Los Angeles Community College.

During this time, Wiseau directed a student film, Robbery Doesn't Pay, shot with a super 8 camera in the Westwood section of Los Angeles. The film, which does not star Wiseau, has been described by Sestero as "just a dude walking around looking at cars to the 'Blue Monday' by Orgy [cover]"

The Room

Wiseau's film The Room was released in 2003. Its budget was $6 million, the financing of which has remained a source of intrigue. The film was based on an unpublished 540-page novel written by Wiseau himself. The movie was immediately lambasted by critics, but ultimately became a "cult classic" with late-night showings at theaters around the world.

Audience members typically arrive dressed up to look like their favorite characters, interact with the dialogue on screen, and throw plastic cutlery and footballs around the theater in reference to on-screen events. This attention grew into what was dubbed The Rooms 2010–2011 "Love is Blind" International Tour, with the movie being screened in the United Kingdom, Germany, Denmark, Australia and India, among other locations. Wiseau appeared at many of these events, posing for photographs with fans and often addressing the audience before screenings.

In the 2017 film adaptation of Greg Sestero's autobiography The Disaster Artist, James Franco portrays Wiseau, for which he won the Golden Globe Award for Best Actor – Motion Picture Musical or Comedy. Wiseau approved of the choice, as well as that of Dave Franco as Sestero. Wiseau makes a cameo appearance in a post-credits scene as Henry.

Later film projects (2004–present)

In 2004, Wiseau produced and appeared in a short documentary, Homeless in America. In 2010 he starred in a 15-minute parody horror film entitled The House That Drips Blood on Alex.

In September 2015, Wiseau expressed enthusiasm in directing a sequel to Fantastic Four (2015), having personal admiration for the film.

He was featured as the villain Linton Kitano in Samurai Cop 2: Deadly Vengeance, the sequel to the cult classic Samurai Cop. In October 2016, it was announced that Wiseau and Sestero would star in a movie called Best F(r)iends. The movie was written by Sestero and was shot in secret in Los Angeles. The film premiered September 4, 2017 at the Prince Charles Cinema. The first volume of the film was released on March 30, 2017, and volume two was released on June 1 of that same year.

In early February 2019, before a screening of The Room at the Prince Charles Cinema, Wiseau revealed a teaser trailer for his second directorial effort, Big Shark. The trailer features Wiseau, Sestero, Isaiah LaBorde, and a big shark. In a Q&A session afterwards, Sestero said the film was intended to premiere in September 2019, but could not be finished on time. On February 25, 2023, Wiseau confirmed Big Shark is set to release in August 2023, in New York City. Wiseau will also star alongside Greg Sestero in an upcoming UFO film.

Television
In 2008, Wiseau produced and appeared in the pilot episode of a television series called The Neighbors. A trailer for The Neighbors showed a series of clips set in an office. The show's website, accompanied by trailers and announcements at The Room showings in 2015, stated that the show was coming to various media distribution outlets in March 2015. The first four episodes were released on Hulu on March 14, 2015. Two additional episodes were released two months later, on May 26.

In 2009, Wiseau guest-starred in an episode of Tim and Eric Awesome Show, Great Job! titled "Tommy", wherein Wiseau guest-directed a segment titled "Pigman". After Wiseau expressed a desire to work with the duo again, Tim and Eric announced in 2009 that they were developing two series for him.

In 2010, Wiseau appeared in Marc Wootton's 2010 comedy TV series La La Land. In a mockumentary format, Wootton's character, Gary Garner, accepted a role in Wiseau's present production at the time. Wiseau kicked Wootton off the set after Wootton jokingly alluded to using production funds to buy instant lotto tickets.

Internet
In 2011, Wiseau starred in a YouTube web series, Tommy Explains it All, in which he explained his views on various topics ranging from Citizen Kane to the art of kissing. Also in 2011, Wiseau starred in segments on Machinima.com called The Tommy Wi-Show. The segments show Wiseau playing various video games, such as Mortal Kombat and Driver: San Francisco, and offering commentary. In 2019, Wiseau starred in the pilot for an animated webseries titled SpaceWorld.

Personal life
Wiseau remains private about the details of his personal and family life. In 2017, he told Entertainment Weekly, "I think private life should be private life, the professional life should be the professional life, and that's where I stand, and I have right [sic] to do that." During a 2016 interview with James Franco, Wiseau referred to Greg Sestero as his "best friend". In a December 2017 interview with Howard Stern, he claimed to speak fluent French and said he is a Catholic.

In early 2020, Wiseau was ordered by a Canadian judge to pay $550,000 in lost revenue and $200,000 in punitive damages to the makers of the documentary Room Full of Spoons, after Wiseau tried to block the film's release, feeling it depicted him in a negative way.

Filmography

Film

Television

Web shows

Music videos

Awards and nominations

References

Further reading

External links

 
 

1950s births
Living people
American male film actors
American film directors
American film producers
American male screenwriters
American male television actors
American people of Polish descent
Film directors from Louisiana
Immigrants to the United States
Film and television memes
Outsider artists
Internet memes
Age controversies
American Roman Catholics